Jamie Theresa Phelps, O.P. (born October 24, 1941) is an American Catholic theologian. Phelps, who is African American, is known for her contributions to womanist theology.

Biography 
Phelps was born in Alabama, the youngest of six children of a Catholic household. She became an Adrian Dominican Sister in 1959.

Phelps pursued her PhD in systematic theology from Catholic University of America, publishing her dissertation in 1989 as The Mission Ecclesiology of John R. Slattery. She has taught at Loyola University, Chicago and Seattle University, and for eight years as Director of the Institute for Black Catholic Studies and the Katharine Drexel Professor of Systematic Theology at Xavier University in New Orleans.

Phelps helped to restart the annual meetings of Black Catholic Theological Symposium in 1991, after two first meetings in 1978 and 1979.

Honors 
In 2010, Phelps received the Ann O'Hara Graff Memorial Award from the Women's Seminar in Constructive Theology of the Catholic Theological Society of America.

Works

References 

1941 births
Living people
Catholic University of America alumni
African-American theologians
Religious studies scholars
Women Christian theologians
Womanist theologians
20th-century American Roman Catholic theologians
21st-century American Roman Catholic theologians
African-American Roman Catholic religious sisters and nuns
20th-century African-American women writers
20th-century American women writers
20th-century African-American writers
21st-century American women
21st-century African-American women writers
21st-century American women writers
21st-century African-American writers
African-American Catholic consecrated religious